Marcel Gobillot (3 January 1900 – 12 January 1981) was a French cyclist who competed in the road race at the 1920 Summer Olympics. He finished 14th individually and won a gold medal with the French time trial team. He placed ninth at the 1921 UCI Road World Championships.

In 1922 he turned professional and rode the 1926 Tour de France. He retired in 1931.

References

External links

profile

1900 births
1981 deaths
French male cyclists
Olympic cyclists of France
Cyclists at the 1920 Summer Olympics
Olympic gold medalists for France
Olympic medalists in cycling
Cyclists from Paris
Medalists at the 1920 Summer Olympics